Jessica Balogun (born December 20, 1988) is a German professional boxer. She was a standout amateur and is now a world champion professional boxer.

Early life

Balogun was born on December 20, 1988, in Aachen, Germany. She is of Nigerian descent. Six months after Balogun's birth, she arrived in Stuttgart with her mother. She found her first contact with the young boxing club of MTK Boxen Aachen, through a classmate while in school in Aachen, Germany.

Amateur career 

Balogun joined MTK Boxen Aachen in the summer of 2005. In her first competition, on April 1, 2006, she won the West German Championship with a K.O. victory in round one. Six months later, she finished the 4th International German Women's Box Championships in Herrischried / Südbaden, and won the title of the International German Champion after her win in round two. She made Aachen sports history by being the first boxing champion of the old Kaiserstadt. In November 2006 Balogun won the International Women's boxing tournament, Baden Open, by two first-round K.O. victories. The "Open Aachen City Championship", founded by her association, MTK Boxen Aachen, in 2002, which brought her the fourth title in 2006. This time, she defeated her opponent in the third round by K.O. Balogun's success as an amateur boxer is currently (end of 2006) with 10 wins in 10 fights.

Professional career 
At the beginning of 2008, Balogun moved to the professional camp. Here, she signed a trainer and managerial contract with her discoverer, Aachen coach and manager Mario Guedes. On February 23, 2008, she had her first professional fight and fought her way through five victories in a row. On June 7, 2008, Balogun won the World Championship and World Championship title (WFC), as well as the world champion and super-welterweight champion, in the main battle of the 6th Hattersheimer Boxing Night against undefeated European champion Anja Henning. Balogun advanced to No. 5 with this victory in an independent computer world tournament. On 24 January 2009, Balogun conceded her 11th professional boxing match and won her second world title. In Port-au-Prince, the capital of Haiti, she also won the GBU World Junior Championship. They beat their opponent Evelina Diaz in the 5th round K.O. On November 29, 2008, she defended her WFC World Super-Welterweight title against Tatjana Dieckmann in Aachen, by K.O., in round 4. After the GBU World Cup victory in Haiti, Balogun successfully defended the junior welterweight title against Daniela David from Romania.

In her 13th professional boxing match, she beat Olga Bojare from Latvia on September 5, 2009, for the vacant WFC world welterweight title. She won confidently with 100-90 points. The WFC welterweight title was then defended against Eva Halasi (Serbia, 21 November 2009), again Olga Bojare (March 13, 2010), and against Angel McKenzie (June 4, 2010) and Marija Pejakovic (Serbia). On 20 November 2010, Balogun also won the WIBA World Championship title against the Spaniard Loli Munoz. Then, on December 3 in 2011, she won the World Championship title of the GBU against the Romanian Floarea Lihet.

On June 2, 2012, Balogun in Herning, Denmark performed her 24th Profibox fight. The opponent was the Norwegian Cecilia Brækhus, owner of the world championship belt of WBA, WBC, and WBO. Balogun lost after ten rounds, (22-2, 10 KOs) on points.  Balogun also lost in Magdeburg against Christina Hammer, in March of 2014. On the other hand, she was able to defend the world championship belt in super welterweight after the WFC on April 26, 2014, in Stolberg against Edita Lesnik from Bosnia-Herzegovina. Subsequently, Balogun had to defeat the Norwegian Braekhus again on June 7, 2014 in Schwerin.

Amateur accomplishments

Balogun won world championships throughout her amateur career.

Professional accomplishments
7/6/2008 - WFC European Super Welterweight (female)
1/24/2009 - GBU (European Champion) Junior Welterweight (Female)
11/20/2010 - WIBA (World Champion) Welterweight (female)

Professional boxing record

References

5. Cecilia Braekhus Ready. September 13, 2012. "World Boxing Organization".https://wboboxing.com/tag/wbo-female/page/2/

External links

1988 births
Living people
Sportspeople from Aachen
German women boxers
German sportspeople of Nigerian descent
World boxing champions
Super-featherweight boxers
Yoruba sportswomen